Norbert Roettiers (1665 – 18 May 1727) was a celebrated Flanders-born engraver of currency and medals in both England and France. With his elder brother James he was named Engraver-General to the British Royal Mint in 1695.

Roettiers was born in Antwerp, the third son of John Roettiers (1631–1703), and a member of an illustrious family of engravers, goldsmiths, and silversmiths, including his brother James Roettiers (1663–1698); cousin Joseph-Charles Roettiers (1691–1779); son Jacques Roettiers (1707–1784), also known as James; and grandson Jacques-Nicolas Roettiers (1736–1788).

He was employed in the British Royal Mint from about 1684 onwards, and in 1690 was officially the given post (together with his brother James) of assistant engraver. He was a strong Jacobite and left England about 1695 to attach himself to the Stuart court. He was later appointed engraver-general to the French mint, and died at his country seat in France.

References
 
 The Jacobite Peerage, Baronetage, Knightage and Grants of Honour, by the Marquis of Ruvigny and Raineval, Edinburgh: T.C. & E.C. Jack, page 247, 1904.

External links
 

1665 births
1727 deaths
English goldsmiths
English silversmiths
English medallists